Shepherd and Boyd was an American silversmith partnership between Robert Shepherd (1781  March 6, 1853) and William Boyd (September 14, 1774  April 24, 1840), active at 136 Market Street, Albany, New York, from 1806 to 1830. Their work is collected in the Albany Institute of History & Art, Clark Art Institute, Metropolitan Museum of Art, Museum of Fine Arts, Boston, and Yale University Art Gallery.

References 
 American Silversmiths and Their Marks: The Definitive (1948) Edition, Stephen G. C. Ensko, Courier Corporation, 2012, page 119.
 Old Plate, Its Makers & Marks, John Henry Buck, Gorham Manufacturing Company, 1903, pages 50–51.
 Early American silver and its makers, Jane Bentley, Mayflower Books, 1979, page 121.
 Antiques Magazine, Volume 60, 1951, page 50.
 American Silver-Hilted, Revolutionary and Early Federal Swords, Volume II: According to Their Geographical Areas of Mounting, Daniel D. Hartzler, Xlibris Corporation, 2015.
 "Shepherd and Boyd", Sterling Flatware Fashions.
 "Robert Shepherd", American Silversmiths.
 "William Boyd", American Silversmiths.

American silversmiths